Rear Admiral M Anwar Hossain NGP, PCGM, ndc, afwc, psc is the incumbent Commander of Khulna Naval Area. He also served as deputy director General(DDG) of Bangladesh Coast Guard.

Career 
Hossain was commissioned in Bangladesh Navy on 1 January 1988.

Hossain oversaw Cooperation Afloat Readiness and Training exercises in 2019 between the United States Navy and Bangladesh Navy in the School of Maritime Warfare and Tactics. He commanded the Naval Administrative Authority in Dhaka in 2019.

In 2020, Hossain served as the Deputy Director General of Bangladesh Coast Guard.

Hossain headed Naval Administrative Authority Dhaka as a Commodore until he promoted to Rear Admiral. Then he posted as Khulna Regional Naval Commander. Before this appointment, he successfully commanded the Bangladesh Coast Guard and he attended the 4th regional Commander's meeting with the Indian side.

Personal life 
Anwar Hossain is married to his wife, Lubna Anwar. They have two children; one son and one daughter.  His son is second general Naval officer.

References 

Bangladesh Navy personnel
Bangladeshi Navy admirals
Year of birth missing (living people)
Living people